"California Soul" is a funk-soul tune written by Ashford & Simpson, issued originally as the B-side of the Messengers' single "Window Shopping" in 1967 under the Motown group of labels.

Other recordings
Nick Ashford then released his own version in June 1968 on Verve 10599. 
The song was then issued as a single by American pop quintet The 5th Dimension in late 1968.
The song was also covered by Motown vocal duo Marvin Gaye and Tammi Terrell. It was Gaye's and Terrell's last single together when released in early 1970.
A version appears on the 1970 studio album War & Peace by Edwin Starr (Gordy Records). Cash Box said that this version "glimmers with the special touch of a motor city arrangement and the vocal fuel ignited by this splendid team."

Chart performance
Both The 5th Dimension's version and the Gaye-Terrell version were modest charted hits. The 5th Dimension's performed better, reaching number twenty-five on the pop singles chart. Marvin and Tammi's cover was the B-side of "The Onion Song". The duo's version of "California Soul" reached number fifty pop but never charted on the US R&B chart. The duet was released after Terrell's death from a brain tumor in March 1970.

Credits

The 5th Dimension version
All vocals by The 5th Dimension: Billy Davis Jr., Marilyn McCoo, Florence LaRue, Lamonte McLemore, and Ron Townson
Written by Ashford & Simpson
Produced by Bones Howe

Marvin Gaye and Tammi Terrell version
All vocals by Marvin Gaye and Tammi Terrell (contrary to misreports, Valerie Simpson denied ever subbing for Terrell)
Written and produced by Ashford & Simpson
Instrumentation by The Funk Brothers

Certifications and sales

Marlena Shaw version

References

1967 songs
1969 singles
1970 singles
The 5th Dimension songs
Marvin Gaye songs
Tammi Terrell songs
Songs about California
Songs about soul
Songs written by Valerie Simpson
Songs written by Nickolas Ashford
Male–female vocal duets